Talat Avni Özüdoğru (1880 in Samsun – August 13, 1939 in Samsun) was a military officer of the Ottoman Army, a politician of the Ottoman Empire and the Republic of Turkey. He was an elder brother of Şefik Avni (Özüdoğru).

Sources

1880 births
1939 deaths
People from Samsun
Ottoman Military Academy alumni
Ottoman Military College alumni
Ottoman Army officers
Ottoman military personnel of the Italo-Turkish War
Politicians of the Ottoman Empire
Ottoman military personnel of the Balkan Wars
Members of the Grand National Assembly of Turkey